The Ceremonial Unit of the Cuban Revolutionary Armed Forces is a ceremonial rituals battalion of the Cuban Revolutionary Armed Forces. Since its foundation on December 15, 1961, the male and female members of the unit has provided honours for the Communist Party of Cuba, the Government of Cuba, and the Revolutionary Armed Forces (FAR). The unit uses intense physical and political techniques, including martial, maintain the discipline that is required for the soldiers and officers of the ceremonial unit.

Ceremonial functions and history
The unit's main function is the perform the changing of the guard every half-hour at the José Marti Mausoleum inside Santa Ifigenia Cemetery. In addition to providing honors related to protocol (funeral honors, presentation of credentials, the delivery of national medals, welcoming of foreign naval fleets, wreath laying ceremonies, street lining for military parades on the Plaza de la Revolución). The unit represents the revolutionary armed forces during arrival ceremonies at the Palace of the Revolution for state visits to Havana, with musical accompaniment provided by the Band of the Ceremonial Unit. In recent years, the unit has taken part in the welcoming of Barack Obama, the Prince of Wales and Felipe IV of Spain. During the honors for Soviet leader Leonid Brezhnev in 1974, the unit's color guard carried the branch colors of the Soviet Army, Navy, and Air Force. Outside of the country, the unit has most notably taken part in the 2015 China Victory Day Parade. During the rehearsals for the parade, the 82 member formation was often noted for being the last ones on the drill field and the few to use chinese martial arts such as Tai chi in their exercises. The unit also played a large role in the death and state funeral of Fidel Castro in November 2016. In 1991, the Ceremonial Unit debuted an historical dress uniform worn during the opening ceremony of the 1991 Pan American Games held in Havana, inspired by the rayadillo-styled uniforms worn by the Cuban revolutionary soldiers of the War of Independence and the Spanish-American War.

Holidays that are covered by the unit include:

Triumph of the Revolution (1 January)
Victory Day (2 January)
Day of the Cuban Armed Forces (2 December)
Day of the National Rebellion (26 July)
Independence Day (10 October)

The unit also includes in its ranks a ceremonial artillery battery which fires 21-gun salutes in state events.

Gallery

External links

Videos
 A military formation of the unit a the 2015 China Victory Day Parade in Beijing

 The Changing of the Guard in Havana in 2008
 Парад, посвященный 70-летию Великой Победы на Кубе

Sources

Guards of honour
Military units and formations established in 1961
Military units and formations of Cuba